Shiozawa Dam is a gravity dam located in Gunma Prefecture in Japan. The dam is used for flood control and water supply. The catchment area of the dam is 7.8 km2. The dam impounds about 3  ha of land when full and can store 303 thousand cubic meters of water. The construction of the dam was started on 1984 and completed in 1995.

References

Dams in Gunma Prefecture